The Miss Nicaragua 2022 was the 41st edition of the Miss Nicaragua pageant held on August 6, 2022 in the Crowne Plaza Hotel and Convention Center Managua. At the end of the event, Allison Wassmer of Managua crowned Norma Huembes of San Marcos as her successor. She represented Nicaragua at Miss Universe 2022.

Background

Location and date 

On January 26, 2022, the organization announced via Vos TV that the competition will be held on August 6, 2022, and can be watching across different media platforms and Vos TV.

This year the organization announced that are searching for the official delegates months before the final competition to ladies that want to know more about the beauty pageant.

The 2022 competition saw the debut of Cinco Pinos, San Jorge, Somoto and the return of León, Matagalpa,  San Marcos and Tipitapa. Meanwhile Acoyapa, Masaya, Puerto Cabezas and Rivas will not compete this year.

This year the pageant was hosted by Miss Universe Nicaragua 2006 Cristiana Frixione, Kenneth Salgero and Carmencita Terran and Miss Universe Nicaragua 2021 Allison Wassmer during preliminaries shows.

Results

Special Awards

National Costume Competition 

On July 1st the 2022 Miss Nicaragua National Costume Competition took place at Plaza real haldeva in Granada 
under the directionship of Dulce Salgado a national designer from Nicaragua.

Where the 10 delegates dressed a topical costume this year inspired on the Alta Costura the national costumer will be announcement on August 6 in the final night.

Contestants 
10 contestants competed in the pageant in the list appears the name and city where she are from, the age and the department:

Crossovers 
 Gabriela Calix was the first time ever Miss Teen Nicaragua in 2011 under Xiomara Blandino's directionship.
 Norma Huembes competed in Miss Teen Nicaragua 2015.
 Diana Navarro competed in Miss Teen Nicaragua 2016'''.
 Isabella Salgado competed in Miss Nicaragua 2021 representing Chinandega.

References  

Miss Nicaragua
2022 beauty pageants